The Council of Major Superiors of Women Religious (CMSWR) is one of two associations of the leaders of congregations of Catholic women religious in the United States (the other being the Leadership Conference of Women Religious). , CMSWR includes the leaders of 112 religious congregations which have a total membership of approximately 5,700 women religious in the United States.

Established on 12 June 1992 with provisional approval by the Holy See's Congregation for Institutes of Consecrated Life and Societies of Apostolic Life, it obtained definitive approval on 26 October 1995 under the pontificate of Pope John Paul II.

The council's purpose is to promote collaboration and inter-communication among its members, participation, dialogue and education about the teaching of the Catholic Church on the religious life, unity with the Pope and cooperation with the United States Conference of Catholic Bishops.

CMSWR is one of four United States federations of institutes of consecrated life and societies of apostolic life that have received approval from the Holy See, the others being the Conference of Major Superiors of Men's Institutes USA, the Leadership Conference of Women Religious, and the US Conference of Secular Institutes.

History
In the 1980s, several religious communities saw the Leadership Conference of Women Religious, which had been established on December 12, 1959 under the name "Conference of Major Superiors of Women in the United States", as turning towards secular and political interests and as supporting dissent from the Church's teaching. They asked to be authorized to form a parallel association clearly loyal to the Magisterium, and the Holy See finally granted their request in 1992.

CMSWR members differ from those of the LCWR in having "major superiors" rather than "leaders" and in wearing recognizable religious habits. Their institutes have only 20% of the women religious of the United States, but they are younger, and growing in numbers.

According to the 2009 Study on Recent Vocations by the Center for Applied Research in the Apostolate, the average median age of nuns and sisters in CMSWR institutes was 60, compared with 74 for those in LCWR; among those joining CMSWR institutes only 15% were over 40, compared with 56% for LCWR institutes; 43% of the CMSWR institutes had at least 5 novices, compared with 9% of the LCWR institutes.

In January 2009, the Congregation for Institutes of Consecrated Life and Societies of Apostolic Life announced it would conduct an apostolic visitation of American women religious to examine their quality of life, ministries, and vocation efforts. The congregation under the leadership of Cardinal Franc Rode, appointed Superior General Mother Mary Clare Millea to oversee the visitation. The council welcomed the visitation and encouraged members to cooperate fully.

In October 2010, the council's chairperson Sister Regina Marie Gorman and former chairperson Sister Ann Marie Karlovic O.P. met with Pope Benedict XVI at the Apostolic Palace in Rome.

In March 2012, the council celebrated their 20th founding anniversary and its board of directors met with Archbishop Salvatore Fisichella, president of the Pontifical Council for the Promotion of the New Evangelisation.

Current officers
, the CMSWR Chairperson is Mother Mary McGreevy, RSM, (Superior General, Religious Sisters of Mercy); the Assistant Chairperson is Mother Anna Grace Neean, OP (Prioress General, Dominican Sisters of St. Cecilia). The current Episcopal Liaison, appointed by the Holy See  is Cardinal Justin Francis Rigali.

Canonized and beatified members of CMSWR-led Congregations
Various individual members of religious congregations presently belonging to the council have been canonized or beatified by the Catholic Church, among which are the following:

 Saint Jeanne Jugan, foundress of the Little Sisters of the Poor (canonized October 2009)
 Saint Leonie Aviat, co-foundress of Oblate Sisters of Saint Francis de Sales (canonized November 2001)
 Saint Teresa of Calcutta, foundress of the Missionaries of Charity (canonized September 2016)
 Blessed Maria Ines Teresa of the Blessed Sacrament, foundress of the Poor Clare Missionary Sisters of the Blessed Sacrament (beatified April 2012)
 Blessed Maria Catalina Irigoyen Echegaray, sister of the Servants of Mary, Ministers to the Sick (beatified in October 2011).
 Blessed Louis Brisson, main founder of both congregations: Oblate Sisters of St. Francis de Sales and Oblates of St. Francis de Sales.
 Blessed Maria Theresia Bonzel, foundress of the Sisters of St. Francis of Perpetual Adoration (beatified November 2013).
 Servant of God Mother Mary Teresa Tallon, foundress of the Congregation of the Parochial Visitors of Mary the Immaculate (February 2013)

See also
 Catholic religious institute
 Vocational discernment in the Catholic Church
 Catholic sisters and nuns in the United States

References

External links
 CMSWR homepage

1992 establishments in the United States
Catholic organizations established in the 20th century
Professional associations based in the United States
Catholic Church in the United States
Organisation of Catholic religious orders
+
Women's organizations based in the United States